The 2019–20 season was Feyenoord's 112th season of play, the club's 64th season in the Eredivisie and its 98th consecutive season in the top flight of Dutch football. Feyenoord entered the 2019–20 KNVB Cup in the second round and entered the 2019–20 UEFA Europa League in the third qualifying round.

Competitions

Overview

Eredivisie

League table

Results by matchday

Matches

KNVB Cup

Europa League

Qualifying phase 

Third qualifying round

Play-off round

Group stage

Statistics

Player details

Appearances (Apps.) numbers are for appearances in competitive games only including sub appearances
Red card numbers denote: Numbers in parentheses represent red cards overturned for wrongful dismissal.
‡= Preseason squad or youth player, not a member of first team.

Hat-tricks

Clean sheets

Transfers

Summer window

In:

 (return from loan)
 (return from loan)
 (return from loan)

 (on loan)
 
 (on loan)

Out:

 (on loan)
 (on loan)
 (on loan)
 (return from loan)
 (return from loan)

 (on loan)

 (on loan)
 (on loan)
 (on loan)
 (on loan)

Winter window

In:

 (return from loan)
 (return from loan)

 (on loan)

Out:

 (on loan)
 
 (on loan)

 (on loan)

References

Feyenoord seasons
Feyenoord
Feyenoord